NWM is an initialism which can stand for:
 Nasiah Wanganeen-Milera, Australian rules footballer
 NatWest Markets, the investment banking arm of NatWest Group 
 National Workers' Movement, a trade union in Saint Vincent and the Grenadines
 New Milton railway station, Hampshire, National Rail station code